

Athulf (died after 1013) was a medieval Bishop of Hereford. He was consecrated before 971 and died after 1013.

Notes

Citations

References

External links
 

Bishops of Hereford
10th-century English bishops
11th-century English Roman Catholic bishops